Crossotini is a tribe of longhorn beetles of the subfamily Lamiinae. It was described by Thomson in 1864.

Taxonomy
 Apodasya Pascoe, 1863
 Biasmia Pascoe, 1864
 Biobessa Gahan, 1898
 Cincinnata Jordan, 1894
 Corus Pascoe, 1888
 Corynofrea Aurivillius, 1910
 Crossotus Audinet-Serville, 1835
 Dichostates Thomson, 1860
 Ecyroschema Thomson, 1864
 Epidichostates Teocchi & Sudre, 2003
 Epirochroa Fairmaire, 1896
 Epirochroides Breuning, 1942
 Falsobiobessa Breuning, 1942
 Frea Thomson, 1858
 Frearanova Breuning, 1958
 Freocorus Hunt & Breuning, 1955
 Freocrossotus Lepesme & Breuning, 1956
 Freopsis Hintz, 1912
 Freostathes Breuning, 1969
 Gasponia Fairmaire, 1893
 Geteuma Thomson, 1864
 Hecyra Thomson, 1857
 Hecyroides Breuning, 1938
 Hecyromorpha Breuning, 1942
 Lagrida Jordan, 1894
 Lasiocercis Waterhouse, 1882
 Leucographus Waterhouse, 1878
 Megalofrea Aurivillius, 1920
 Mimiculus Jordan, 1894
 Mimocorus Breuning, 1942
 Mimocrossotus Breuning, 1964
 Mimohecyra Breuning, 1966
 Mimomimiculus Breuning, 1970
 Mimomusonius Breuning, 1980
 Moechohecyra Breuning, 1938
 Moechotypa Thomson, 1864
 Musonius Fairmaire, 1902
 Mycerinus Thomson, 1865
 Neofreocorus  Téocchi, 1988
 Neohecyra Breuning, 1936
 Niphecyra Kolbe, 1894
 Pallidohecyra Breuning, 1956
 Parabiobessa Breuning, 1936
 Paracorus Breuning, 1969
 Paracrossotus Breuning, 1969
 Paradichostathes Breuning, 1969
 Parafreoides Breuning, 1975
 Paragasponia Breuning, 1981
 Paramimiculus Breuning, 1964
 Paramusonius Breuning, 1980
 Paraphanis Breuning, 1977
 Parasophronicomimus Breuning, 1971
 Paratlepolemoides Breuning, 1962
 Parecyroschema Breuning, 1969
 Parhecyra Breuning, 1942
 Phanis Fairmaire, 1893
 Plectropygus Gahan, 1898
 Pseudhecyra Breuning, 1976
 Pseudocorus Breuning, 1960
 Pseudocrossotus Breuning, 1978
 Pseudofrea Breuning, 1978
 Pseudohecyra Breuning, 1942
 Ranova Thomson, 1864
 Sophronicomimus Breuning, 1957
 Stenideopsis Breuning, 1940
 Sthenopygus Breuning, 1938
 Tambusoides Breuning, 1955
 Tetradia Thomson, 1864
 Tlepolemoides Breuning, 1957
 Tlepolemus Thomson, 1864
 Trachyliopus Fairmaire, 1901

References

 
Beetle tribes